Großwalbur is a village in the municipality Meeder, district of Coburg, northern Bavaria, Germany. It is situated 16 km southeast of Hildburghausen, and 14 km northwest of Coburg.

History
Großwalbur was founded in 833.

On May 1, 1978, Großwalbur became a village in the municipality Meeder.

Population history

Culture
Großwalbur is locally well known for its sports club 'TSV 05 Großwalbur' with its main sport activities like handball and table tennis. 'SKC Olympia Großwalbur' and 'KC Jahn' are sports clubs for bowling there. Furthermore, there are a lot of people who like running to keep in shape or attend marathon and short distance competitions. A sport fanatic guy from Großwalbur is a triathlete and took even part on the worldwide biggest triathlon competition, the Iron Man of Hawaii.

Apart from sport activities you will find cultural societies in Großwalbur like a choral society, a brass band and a citizens organisation named 'Bürgerverein Großwalbur e.V.'.

The rib vault in the nave of the evangelical-Lutheran parish church St. Oswald dates from 1477. The present form with the gable roof was built in 1748. The octagonal form of the towers dates from the sixteenth century.

Notes

Coburg (district)